James Stephen McCarthy (30 June 1924 – 21 April 2015) was an Irish rugby union player who played for Munster, the Irish national team, and the British and Irish Lions. He was a member of the Grand Slam winning Irish squad in the 1948 Five Nations Championship.

References

External links

1924 births
2015 deaths
Irish rugby union players
Ireland international rugby union players
British & Irish Lions rugby union players from Ireland
Munster Rugby players
Rugby union flankers
Dolphin RFC players
Rugby union players from Cork (city)